The Norfolk County Council election took place on 4 June 2009, coinciding with local elections for all county councils in England.

The Conservative administration was re-elected with an increased majority and, as in Suffolk and Kent, the Liberal Democrats replaced Labour as the main opposition party.

The Conservatives increased their majority on the council from 10 to a comfortable 36 seats with a net gain of 14 seats. They held virtually all of their seats across the county, but made a net loss of 1 seat to the Liberal democrats in North Norfolk.

The Liberal Democrats performed well in the North Norfolk area through making a net gain of 1 against the Conservatives, and gaining Thetford West from Labour in Breckland, but lost seats to the conservatives in King's Lynn & West Norfolk and South Norfolk as the latter swept the board.  Despite the party's flat-lining, they became the official opposition to the governing conservative administration.

Labour, just as had been the case across the rest of the country, suffered heavy losses to all parties and especially to the conservatives being left with just 3 seats across the county, being pushed in to 4th place behind the Green Party for the first time.

The Green Party made gains, particularly in Norwich where they won a majority of seats, which built upon their successes in city elections over the preceding years.  They won more seats than labour across the county, but did not beat them in share of vote.

The United Kingdom Independence Party stood candidates in some seats, winning one in Great Yarmouth from Labour.

Other parties and independent candidates stood without winning seats and making little impact.

Previous composition

2005 election

Composition of council seats before election

Changes between elections

In between the 2005 election and the 2009 election, the following council seats changed hands:

Summary of results

|-bgcolor=#F6F6F6
| colspan=2 style="text-align: right; margin-right: 1em" | Total
| style="text-align: right;" | 84
| colspan=5 |
| style="text-align: right;" | 251,082
| style="text-align: right;" | 
|-

Election of Group Leaders

Daniel Cox (Humbleyard) was re-elected leader of the Conservative Group, Paul Morse (North Walsham East) was elected leader of the Liberal Democratic Group, Richard Bearman (Mancroft) was elected leader of the Green Party group and George Nobbs (Crome) became leader of the Labour Group now down to just 3 members.

Election of Leader of the Council

Daniel Cox the leader of the conservative group was duly re-elected leader of the council and formed a conservative administration.

He would unexpectedly resign in October 2010 and was replaced by his deputy Derrick Murphy (Freebridge Lynn)

Murphy himself would be forced to resign after a controversy emerged over an email which was sent by a political assistant to the Conservative group at County Hall, to BBC Radio Norfolk in April 2012, which suggested that the leader of West Norfolk Council, Nick Daubney and facing 'a serious leadership challenge' over King's Lynn incinerator, which had been a source of tension between the two Councils.

His deputy Bill Borrett (Elmham & Mattishall) replaced him.

Graphic version of results
Breckland

Broadland

Great Yarmouth

King's Lynn and West Norfolk

North Norfolk

Norwich

South Norfolk

Results by district
Gains and losses are in comparison to the preceding full election in 2005, unless otherwise stated. Intervening by-elections are noted.

Breckland

Division results

Broadland

Division results

At a by-election held on 14 July 2011, Old Catton was retained by the Conservatives.

Great Yarmouth

Division results

At a by-election on 5 May 2011, Lothingland was retained by the Conservatives.

King's Lynn and West Norfolk

Division results

At a by-election on 27 September 2012, Clenchwarton and King's Lynn South was won by the Labour Party.

North Norfolk

Division results

Norwich

Division results

At a by-election on 24 November 2011, Lakenham was regained by the Labour Party.

South Norfolk

Division results

At a by-election on 13 January 2011, the Conservatives retained Humbleyard.

References

2009 English local elections
2009
2000s in Norfolk